Heaven is the first book in the Casteel series by author V. C. Andrews. It is also the first name of the main character. It was first published on November 1st, 1985, and is one of Andrews most popular works.

Plot

In 1961 a ten-year-old Heaven is awoken by her Granny and taken to a grave of Leigh Casteel. Heaven is told this is her birth mother who had died giving birth to Heaven. Granny then gives Heaven a beautiful doll that was made to look exactly like Heaven, with the exception of pale blonde hair. Heaven is stunned to learn that the doll is, in fact, an exact replica of her mother Leigh. Granny tells her that this doll will lead Heaven to her mother's family in Boston, thus changing the course of her entire life forever.
 

In the year of 1965, Heaven Leigh Casteel is a fourteen-year-old girl living in extreme poverty with her rather large and discontented family, in a shack in the mountains of West Virginia. Her father, Luke, is still haunted by the memory of his beloved first wife who died giving birth to Heaven. Luke almost never speaks to Heaven. He is rarely home and his new wife, Sarah, struggles to take care of Heaven and her half-siblings—Tom, Fanny (who is very pretty and somewhat promiscuous), and Keith and Jane. The Casteel family is looked down upon by the rest of the town, often referred to as "the hillbilly scum". Despite their poverty, Heaven and Tom work very hard at school, with Heaven hoping to become a schoolteacher when she is older. During this time, Heaven begins to develop a relationship with a local boy, Logan Stonewall. Meanwhile, Luke spends most of his time in a local brothel, where he eventually contracts syphilis, causing Sarah's next child to be born dead. Heaven's grandmother passes away the same day. The stillbirth is the last straw for Sarah, who had always hoped giving Luke a "dark-haired boy" like himself would finally make him love her. Sarah disappears, leaving a note. Luke is nowhere to be found, so the children are left to fend for themselves. Logan offers to help them, but Heaven is too proud (and embarrassed)  to admit that they are struggling. Heaven misses a lot of school, since she now has to be mother to the family, take care of the shack and her frail, somewhat senile grandfather.

Whenever things look bleak, Luke shows up with food to save the day, but his attempts to make money fail, and eventually, he comes up with a plan to sell his children for $500 apiece. Keith and Jane are first bought by a nice couple, but Heaven is devastated at what is happening. Shortly after, the local preacher is interested in buying Heaven, but Luke persuades him that the younger sister, Fanny, is much more suitable for his household. Then a farmer comes for Tom, and Heaven can barely take it as Tom was her closest and best friend. Heaven's brothers and sisters are all sold before her, leaving her alone. It seems as though Luke may actually want to keep Heaven, as one night (thinking she is asleep), he comes to her and strokes her hair, muttering how soft and beautiful it is. Heaven feigns sleep and is confused as to why he is finally showing an interest. Then she hears her grandfather interrupt Luke, asking what he is doing in an upset voice. Luke seems defensive and says Heaven is his, and he can do what he wants, but Luke's father tells him no, and that he needs to send Heaven away. Heaven does not understand or realize what Luke's intentions were, and feels everyone is rejecting her now.

A few days later, Heaven is sold to a couple named Kitty and Cal Dennison. Kitty is controlling, obsessed with cleanliness, and though kind to Heaven at times, she often seems to hate Heaven and treat her like an unpaid maid. Kitty's husband Cal suffers from constantly being sexually teased and tormented by his wife.  Cal and Heaven develop a close relationship, partly as a result of Kitty's treatment of them. Kitty actually starts to become violent and beat Heaven at times. Her cruelty is later revealed to be caused by the fact that Kitty once was in love with Luke and almost had his child. When Luke brought Heaven's mother back to town, Kitty attempted a home abortion, which went badly wrong and meant that she lost her ability to have children. Because of this, Kitty sees Heaven both as a release for her anger towards Luke, and as the daughter she was never able to have, causing Kitty to be wildly inconsistent in her treatment of Heaven. Heaven has kept her doll hidden, but one day Kitty sees her with it. Kitty becomes furious when she sees the doll is the exact likeness of Leigh. In a fit of rage, Kitty burns the doll. Devastated by the loss of something that linked her to her mother, Heaven tells Kitty she wishes she were dead, and Kitty beats her unconscious. Cal finds her later and tries to comfort her, but he also kisses her passionately. Heaven resists, but Cal eventually pressures her into having sex with him. Heaven gives in partly because she longs for affection and partly because she feels sorry for Cal over the way Kitty treats him. Although she is overcome with guilt and shame afterwards, the feeling of being needed by Cal is so important to her that she cannot say no to him.

Kitty becomes sick (later revealed to be breast cancer) and the three go back to Kitty and Heaven's hometown of Winnerrow to seek aid from Kitty's family. After meeting Kitty's family, especially Kitty's mother, Heaven begins to understand Kitty's behaviour and she starts to pity her. While in her hometown, she is reunited with her siblings Tom (who she has missed terribly) and Fanny. Fanny seems happy with the preacher and his wife, but she is also distant to Heaven and seems to be avoiding her. Heaven tries to avoid Logan because she is afraid that he will somehow know what she has done with Cal just from looking at her.  He eventually catches up to her and begs her to see him. She gives in and agrees to meet him the next day early in the morning. However, when she goes back to Kitty's mother house, Cal is waiting for her and tries to kiss her. Heaven pushes him away but Kitty's younger sister, Maisie, sees him with his hand on Heaven's breast. Maisie quickly tells her family about what she saw, and it rapidly spreads through the town. The next day, after she finishes taking care of Kitty, Heaven goes to meet Logan and they spend the day together but Logan cannot keep what he heard to himself and confronts Heaven. Although she is actually the victim in the situation, Heaven feels so guilty about her part in the 'seduction' that she admits it. Too young to understand that this was not Heaven's fault, Logan feels betrayed and runs away from her.

After she walks back into town, Heaven goes to the hospital to find Kitty awake and in a better mood. Kitty then tells Heaven that her father was there looking for her to apologize for everything and that he seemed like a different man. He also wanted to give her two choices: she can live with him and his new wife or try to find her mother's family and live with them, if they will accept her. Unable to forgive her father for the way he treated her and for selling his other children, Heaven decides to go and find her mother's family in Boston. Tom tells Heaven that he is going to live with Luke, as the farmer treats him like a slave. Cal takes Heaven to the airport so she can travel to her mother's family; once he gets her there, he hurries off. Tom shows up with Fanny, who reveals she is pregnant by the preacher and that is why she could not talk to or see Heaven—she has to stay hidden, and the preacher and his wife are going to pretend it is their baby. She hugs Heaven and tells her she loves her, then hurries back to her "home" with Tom before she is discovered missing.

While Heaven is waiting for her plane, she reads in the newspaper that Kitty has died. She thinks of how Cal drove her all the way to the airport and did not even mention this: he wants to start a new life and she is not part of his plans. Heaven is furious and hurt, thinking that after all Cal said about how much he loved her, he dumped her at the first opportunity, abandoning her just like Luke did. All she can do now is hope she finds peace and love with her mother's family.

Adaptation
Lifetime produced an adaptation of Heaven that aired on July 27, 2019, starring Annalise Basso, Chris McNally, James Rittinger, Jessica Clement, Chris William Martin, and Julie Benz. A special edition of the film aired on August 3, 2019 that featured behind the scenes interviews with Basso, McNally, and Rittinger.

Reception

References

External links
 The Complete V. C. Andrews

Young adult fantasy novels
1985 novels